Alex Balfanz, (born May 5, 1999) known online as badcc, is an American video game developer who is the programmer and co-creator of the Roblox game Jailbreak.

Early life
Born in 1999, Balfanz began to code games using Roblox Studio at the age of 9. Balfanz's father worked as a programmer, which Balfanz cites as one of the main reasons for his early interest in coding. He attended high school at the Trinity Preparatory School. Prior to releasing Jailbreak, Balfanz had made several other games on Roblox, which he stated had made him "maybe a couple thousand" dollars.

Career
In January 2016, Balfanz and his business partner, who goes by "asimo3089", created the game Volt, an open-world game in which players complete minigames.

In January 2017, Balfanz, along with asimo3089, uploaded Jailbreak, a cops-and-robbers game, to Roblox. On its first day of release, it reached 70,000 concurrent players, a number which Balfanz later said had shocked him. It quickly became one of the most popular games on the platform, and made Balfanz a millionaire.

Personal life
Balfanz attends Duke University, where he is able to pay off his college debt using funds from his games. Balfanz has also been a YouTuber since 2011, maintaining a channel with over 100,000 subscribers and seven million views. The content uploaded includes Roblox building and scripting content, custom musical pieces, and showcases of new Jailbreak content.

References

Living people
1999 births
American video game programmers
Duke University alumni
Roblox
People from Orlando, Florida
Trinity Preparatory School alumni